is a Japanese historical term referring to the Shinto shrines with the highest rank in a province.

The term gave rise to modern place names, such as the city of Ichinomiya, Aichi.

Overview
The term "Ichinomiya" literally means "first shrine" and is popularly regarded as the highest ranking shrine in each province, with the second ranking shrine referred to as the "Ninomiya" and third ranking shrine as "Sannomiya", and so on. However, there is no documentary material stipulating on how the shrines in each province are to be ranked, or even when this ranking system was created. As a general rule, all shrines designated "Ichinomiya" are of ancient origin and are listed in the Engishiki records completed in 927AD. However, the shrine selected is not necessarily the largest, or oldest, in that province, and is not necessarily one of the "Meishin Taisha", which are regarded as the most important shrines. Rather, per the Ritsuryō legal and administrative system established in the Nara period, kokushi were appointed as imperial governors of each province. When the kokushi travelled from Heian-kyo to his local seat at the provincial capital, the first shrine he called upon officially in his province was the "ichinomiya". As the purpose of this visit was to announce to the local kami of his appointment to office, it was important that this shrine be dedicated to important local deities and to be located close to the provincial capital. Even after the collapse of the Ritsuryō system by the Kamakura period, the ichinomiya continued to enjoy a certain prestige, and often after all vestiges of the provincial capital had fallen into ruins and its exact location lost, the term "Ichinomiya" was often preserved as a place name.　 

Tachibana Mitsuyoshi, a noted Shinto scholar in the early Edo Period visited ichinomiya nationwide for 23 years starting 1675, and wrote the record of his travels in a 13 volume account. This began the popularization of pilgrimages by the common populace to these shrines. Under State Shinto, the ichinomiya were not accorded any special status, although many were accorded high ranks under the Modern system of ranked Shinto shrines.

While as a rule-of-thumb, there can be only one "first shrine" in each province, several provinces have various rival candidates for the title. This has arisen for various reasons: relocation of the provincial capital can result in a new ichinomiya being appointed, or in some cases the merger of two provinces can result in two ichinomiya for the new province. In other cases, due to the ambiguity in the criteria for ichinomiya designation and due to conflicting ancient records, rival claimants have arisen.

References

External links

 National Association of Ichinomiya website

See also
 Fuchū
 Kokubunji
 List of Shinto shrines
 Modern system of ranked Shinto Shrines
 Sannomiya
 Twenty-Two Shrines

Shinto shrines in Japan
Shinto terminology